Willi Multhaup (19 July 1903 – 18 December 1982) was a German football manager and player who led Borussia Dortmund to victory in the UEFA Cup Winners' Cup in 1966.

Career
Multhaup won the 1964–65 Bundesliga with Werder Bremen. He won the European Cup Winners' Cup with Borussia Dortmund the following year. Shortly after he won the 1967–68 DFB-Pokal with 1. FC Köln.

Personal life
Multhaup's son, Hennes, is a sports journalist who works for Axel Springer SE.

Honours
Werder Bremen
 Bundesliga: 1964–65

Borussia Dortmund
 UEFA Cup Winners' Cup: 1966

1. FC Köln
 DFB-Pokal: 1967–68

References

External links
 

 

1903 births
1982 deaths
German footballers
Association football midfielders
Rot-Weiss Essen players
German football managers
SC Preußen Münster managers
MSV Duisburg managers
Rot-Weiss Essen managers
SV Werder Bremen managers
Borussia Dortmund managers
1. FC Köln managers
Bundesliga managers
Footballers from Essen
People from the Province of Westphalia
West German football managers